William Raymond Seagrove (2 July 1898 – 5 June 1980) was a British middle-distance runner. Seagrove was born in London and educated at Highgate School, leaving in April 1917. After serving in the army during World War I, he competed at the 1920 Summer Olympics. He won a silver medal in the 3000 metre team event and finished sixth in the 5000 metre. Four years later at the 1924 Summer Olympics he won a silver medal with the 3000 m British team again.

For a time he taught at Glenalmond College and in 1926 he founded Normansal preparatory school in Seaford, East Sussex, where he was initially headmaster and mathematics master. He remained actively involved in the running of the school after his retirement, and the appointment of Rex Hackett to the headship. Seagrove Way, a street in Seaford, is named after him.

Seagrove was an all-rounder in life. An accomplished pianist and violinist, he ran the Normansal School choir, introduced boys to opera and organised annual visits to the Vienna Boys Choir concerts in Brighton. He was master of ceremonies and umpire at the annual sports day: eight-year-olds competed in pole vault, long jump, shot as well as the usual events. Long-distance running was encouraged.

References

1898 births
1980 deaths
British Army personnel of World War I
English male long-distance runners
Athletes from London
People educated at Highgate School
Olympic athletes of Great Britain
Athletes (track and field) at the 1920 Summer Olympics
Athletes (track and field) at the 1924 Summer Olympics
Olympic silver medallists for Great Britain
Medalists at the 1924 Summer Olympics
Medalists at the 1920 Summer Olympics
Olympic silver medalists in athletics (track and field)